The 100 Squadron of the Israeli Air Force, also known as the Flying Camel Squadron, is a Beech 200 squadron.

Between 1959 and 2019, the squadron was based at Sde Dov Airport. In 2019 it moved to Hatzor Airbase.

See also
Galilee Squadron

References

External links 
Israel Air Force 100 Squadron

Israeli Air Force squadrons